Zinc finger protein 880 is a protein that in humans is encoded by the ZNF880 gene.

References

Further reading